The 2013–14 Santa Clara Broncos women's basketball team represented Santa Clara University in the 2013–14 college basketball season. It was head coach Jennifer Mountain's sixth season at Santa Clara. The Broncos were members of the West Coast Conference and played their home games at the Leavey Center. After finishing the season 10–21, the Broncos chose not to renew Mountains contract.

Before the season
The conference pre-season poll should be released at WCC Media Days in mid-October.

Roster

Schedule and results
Source:

|-
!colspan=9 style="background:#F0E8C4; color:#AA003D;"| Exhibition

|-
!colspan=9 style="background:#AA003D; color:#F0E8C4;"| Regular Season

|-
!colspan=9 style="background:#F0E8C4; color:#AA003D;"| 2014 West Coast Conference women's basketball tournament

Game Summaries

Exhibition: Sonoma State

Exhibition: Humboldt State

UNLV
Series History: Santa Clara leads series 1-0

San Jose State
Series History: Santa Clara leads series 24-20

UC Riverside
Series History: Santa Clara leads series 1-0

San Francisco State
Series History: Santa Clara leads series 8-7

UC Santa Barbara
Series History: UC Santa Barbara leads series 4-2

Cal State Northridge
Series History: Santa Clara leads series 7-2

Hampton
Series History: First Meeting

Fresno State
Series History: Fresno State leads 22-15

Utah Valley
Series History: Santa Clara leads 1-0

UC Davis
Series History: UC Davis leads 12-10

Georgia State
Series History: First Meeting

San Francisco
Series History: Santa Clara leads 52-35

Pepperdine
Series History: Pepperdine leads 33-32
Broadcaster: Josh Perigo

Loyola Marymount
Series History: Santa Clara leads 43-20

Saint Mary's
Series History: Santa Clara leads 33-31

Pacific
Series History: Santa Clara leads 25-16

Portland
Series History: Santa Clara leads 34-29

Gonzaga
Series History: Gonzaga leads 29-27
Broadcaster: George Devine and Mary-Hile Nepfel

San Diego
Series History: Santa Clara leads 32-31

BYU
Series History: BYU leads 6-1
Broadcasters: Spencer Linton, Kristen Kozlowski, and Andy Boyce

Gonzaga
Series History: Gonzaga leads 30-27

Portland
Series History: Santa Clara leads 35-29

BYU
Series History: BYU leads series 7-1
Broadcaster: Doug Greenwald

San Diego
Series History: Series even 32-32

San Francisco
Series History: Santa Clara leads 53-35

Pacific
Series History: Santa Clara leads 25-17
Broadcaster: Don Gubbins

Saint Mary's
Series History: Santa Clara leads 33-32

Loyola Marymount
Series History: Santa Clara leads 44-20

Rankings

See also
Santa Clara Broncos women's basketball

References

Santa Clara Broncos women's basketball seasons
Santa Clara